Guo Pingtan (1 January 1933 – 5 February 2022) was a Chinese politician.

He served in the 6th National People's Congress, which lasted from June 1983 to March 1988. He died on 5 February 2022, at the age of 89.

References

1933 births
2022 deaths
Delegates to the 6th National People's Congress
Members of the 7th Chinese People's Political Consultative Conference
Members of the 8th Chinese People's Political Consultative Conference
20th-century Chinese politicians
Waseda University alumni
Politicians from Tainan